Oscar Avogadro (born  9 August 1951 –  30 September 2010) was an Italian lyricist.
 
Born in Turin, Avogadro debuted in the late 1960s as the vocalist of the short-lived vocal group . After the group disbanded, he started a career as a lyricist, getting his first hits in collaboration with Sandro Giacobbe in the early 1970s. He was a usual collaborator of Mario Lavezzi and Oscar Prudente. In 1983 his song "Margherita non lo sa" ranked third at the 33rd edition of the Sanremo Music Festival.

References

External links 
 
   

 

1951 births 
Italian lyricists  
Musicians from Turin
2010 deaths